Brooks Thompson (born May 28, 2002) is an American professional soccer player who plays as a goalkeeper for Philadelphia Union II in MLS Next Pro.

Club career
Born in Jefferson, Indiana, Thompson was raised in Floyds Knobs. In 2016, Thompson joined the IMG Academy in Bradenton, Florida, playing in the U.S. Soccer Development Academy. The next year, during the summer of 2017, Thompson joined the squad of Premier Development League club Derby City Rovers. He made his debut for the side on June 30, 2017 against the Cincinnati Dutch Lions, starting in the 3–0 defeat. Later that year, Thompson joined the youth academy at Sporting Kansas City.

On March 7, 2019, Thompson signed with Swope Park Rangers, the reserve side of Sporting Kansas City in the USL Championship. He made his debut for the club on July 17, 2019, starting in a 4–3 victory against Hartford Athletic. During the 2020 season, Thompson started 6 matches, averaging 1.17 goals against. On August 4, 2020, Thompson was named into the USL Championship Team of the Week after keeping his first professional clean sheet during a 1–0 victory against Indy Eleven.

Sporting Kansas City
On January 20, 2021, Thompson signed a homegrown player deal for Major League Soccer club Sporting Kansas City. Following the 2021 season, Thompson's contract option was declined by Kansas City.

Philadelphia Union II
In March 2022, Thompson was announced as signing with Philadelphia Union II ahead of their first season competing in MLS Next Pro.

Career statistics

References

External links
 Profile at Sporting Kansas City

2002 births
Living people
People from Floyd County, Indiana
American soccer players
Association football goalkeepers
Derby City Rovers players
Sporting Kansas City II players
Sporting Kansas City players
USL League Two players
USL Championship players
Soccer players from Indiana
Homegrown Players (MLS)
Philadelphia Union II players
MLS Next Pro players